Oudry may refer to:

People
 Jean-Baptiste Oudry (1686–1755), French Rococo painter, engraver, and tapestry designer
 Marie-Marguerite Oudry (1688–1780), French engraver and painter

Places
 Oudry, Saône-et-Loire, commune in the Saône-et-Loire department in the region of Bourgogne in eastern France